Follifoot is a village and civil parish in the Harrogate district of North Yorkshire, England.

History
The village name is derived from Old Norse translating as "place of the horse fight" and the village has a long association with horse sports. Follifoot is not listed in the Domesday Book and the earliest known record is as Pholifet in the 12th century. Anglo-Saxon remains have been discovered in and near to the village and an Anglian cross is displayed at the crossroads at the top of the village.

In the 19th century the village was a thriving community supported by such commerce as the flax industry, tanning, tailors, joiners, a wheelwright, cordwainer and blacksmiths.

Amenities
The village has two pubs the Radcliffe Arms and the Harewood Arms, both Sam Smiths.   The village has one shop and post office and opposite a small school.  There is one Anglican church, St. Joseph and St. James situated on Plompton Road. The village is served by one bus service, the X70 operated by Connexionsbuses and links the village with Harrogate, Spofforth, Wetherby and York.

Rudding Park Estate
The south gatehouse of the Rudding Park Estate stands at the top of the village. The estate was bought by Lord Loughborough in 1788, and he engaged the landscape designer Humphry Repton to improve the grounds and surrounding landscape.

The estate was purchased by the Hon William Gordon in 1805 and he was responsible for the construction of the present house. By the time the estate was purchased by Sir Joseph Radcliffe 19 years later the house was still unfinished. In 1972 the house and 2000-acre estate was acquired by the Mackaness family.

Today the estate compromises a hotel, caravan and camp site, a restaurant and golf course.  The main part of the estate is now separated from the village by the A658 Harrogate bypass.

St. Joseph and St. James Church

St Joseph and St James Church was opened on 22 October 1848 after Sir Joseph Radcliffe, 2nd Baronet (1799–1872), owner of Rudding Park, gave part of Longlands Field for the church site. The church, now grade II listed, contains three stained glass windows dedicated to his  memory.

References

External links

 The Ancient Parish of Spofforth at GENUKI: Follifoot was in this parish

Villages in North Yorkshire
Civil parishes in North Yorkshire